Ken Fleming may refer to:

 Ken Fleming (engineer) (1933–2001), piling engineer
 Ken Fleming (musician) (born 1962), Canadian punk rock musician
 Ken Fleming (politician), member of the Kentucky House of Representatives
 Kenneth Fleming (cricketer) (1909–1996), South African cricketer